Peter Allan may refer to:

Peter Allan (Australian cricketer) (born 1935)
Peter Allan (footballer) (1935–1987), Australian rules footballer 
Peter Allan (at Marsden Grotto) (1799–1849), landlord of the Marsden Grotto pub
Peter Allan (priest) (born 1950), Anglican monk and Principal of the College of the Resurrection
Peter Allan (rugby union) (born 1975), Scottish rugby union referee
Peter John Allan (1825–1848), Canadian poet

See also
Peter Allen (disambiguation)